Rammam River is river in the Darjeeling district of West Bengal, India. It originates in the Singalila range and has much of its course through Darjeeling district. Lodhoma River is a tributary of Rammam. Rammam finally merges with the Rangeet River near Jorethang. Rammam Hydel Power Station is a major hydropower project of West Bengal State Electricity Board.

References

Rivers of West Bengal
Rivers of India
Geography of Darjeeling district